Rajanigandha (English: Tuberose) is a 1982 Bangladeshi film starring Razzak, Alamgir and Shabana opposite them. Ayesha Akter garnered Bangladesh National Film Award for Best Supporting Actress for her performance in the film. Lyricist Masud Karim earned Best Lyricist Award for "Rajnigandha Phuler Moto".

Cast 
 Shabana
 Razzak
 Alamgir
 Tina Khan
 Ayesha Akter

Soundtrack 
All music composed by Alam Khan and lyrics penned by Masud Karim.

Awards 
Bangladesh National Film Awards
Best Supporting Actress - Ayesha Akhtar
Best Lyrics - Masud Karim

References

External links
 

1982 films
Bengali-language Bangladeshi films
Films scored by Alam Khan
1980s Bengali-language films
Films directed by Kamal Ahmed (director)